State Route 51 (SR 51) is a rural secondary north–south state highway that traverses part of northwestern Clay County in Middle Tennessee.

Route description
SR 51 begins at a Y-intersection with SR 52 (Clay County Highway) at Moss. Its northern end is located at the Kentucky state line where it becomes Kentucky Route 163 (KY 163) upon entry into Monroe County, Kentucky. SR 51 is known as “Tompkinsville Highway” for its entire length.

Major intersections

References

051
Transportation in Clay County, Tennessee